Alone is a multilingual action film directed by JKS. Titled Alone in Kannada and Karaioram in Tamil. The film features Simran, Nikesha Patel and Vasistha, Ganesh and Ineya in the supporting roles. The Kannada version of the film released in November 2015, while the Tamil film released in January 2016.

Cast
Simran as Police Inspector (guest appearance)
Nikesha Patel as Priya / Riya Twins Spirit
Ineya as Ramya
Vasistha as John
Arun as Arun
Radharavi as Ramya's father
Ganesh Prasad
 Shanthamma
 Kannada version
 Tabla Nani
 Dileep 
Bullet Prakash
 Mangaluru Suresh

 Tamil version
Manobala as Inspector
Singampuli as Vettukili
Bullet Prakash as Siluvai

Production
The film was announced in September 2014 to be a Kannada horror film titled Alone, but subsequently developed into a multilingual venture. Nikesha Patel was signed to play the lead role, while Kamna Jethmalani was considered for another role. Kamna was later replaced by Ineya for the second leading female role by the launch ceremony of the film. Vasistha was revealed to be playing a leading role, while M. S. Bhaskar and Singampuli were also noted to be a part of the cast.

In April 2015, Simran was signed on to portray a police officer in the film, and was revealed to be making a guest appearance. Sunil Shetty also reportedly worked on the film, making a special appearance as a CBI officer, but later pulled out of the commitment. Reports also emerged of a rift between actresses Nikesha Patel and Ineya during the making of the film. The Telugu version titled Leela is yet to release.

Soundtrack 
Songs by Sujith Shetty.
Kannada
"Nille Nille Nee Nille" - Sujeet Shetty, Kushboo Jain
"Hey Mayajala Mayajalavo" - Tanya
"Hathira Hathira" - Kushboo Jain
"Padhe Padhe" - Kusboo Jain

Release
The Kannada version of the film, Alone, had a theatrical release during November 2015 and won mixed reviews. A critic from Indiaglitz.com noted "the first half is sickening" and "one would feel bored", "but the second half is such a magnificent handling from the director". The Tamil film released on 1 January 2016 and garnered similar reviews to the Kannada version with a critic noting, "an interesting shivered film, the first half drags to the sluggish has been even out and tempo levels in the second half".

References

External links

2010s Tamil-language films
2010s Kannada-language films
2015 films
Indian multilingual films
Indian thriller films
2015 multilingual films
2015 thriller films